On 24 September 2002, multiple terrorists attacked the Akshardham complex in Gandhinagar, Gujarat, India, killing 33 and injuring more than 80. India's National Security Guard intervened and ended the siege the next day, killing the terrorists. Six accused were later arrested by Gujarat Police. The Supreme Court acquitted all six persons in 2014.

Sequence of events

Initial approach 
At approximately 4:45 pm on 24 September 2002, a white ambassador car dropped off two terrorists between the ages of 20 and 25 carrying haversacks and jackets filled with automatic weapons and grenades at Gate 3 of the Akshardham Temple Complex. When the two attempted to enter the Akshardham Temple Complex, the volunteers stopped the armed terrorists for a security screening.

Bypassing the screening, the terrorists jumped over the 7-foot high fence and started firing their guns as they began their rampage through the complex. A priest recalled "a mother begging for the lives of her children-later identified as Priya and Bhailu Chauhan, aged three and four. The woman, Sumitra, had been running with her little boy and girl when she was felled by a bullet in the leg. The killer nodded to her pleas, then turned his gun towards the children and, to the horror of the mother, mowed them down."

Main Akshardham Temple infiltration attempt 
The perpetrators rushed towards the central walkway of the complex while firing shots at visitors and pilgrims who were browsing a nearby bookstall and proceeded to the main temple while throwing hand grenades. As the Akshardham staff, including the temple supervisor, Khodsinh Jadhav witnessed the killings, they rushed across the 200-foot walkway and shut the 15-foot doors of the main temple. As a result, the terrorists were unable to infiltrate the main temple where 35 people were offering prayers.

At 4:48 pm, three minutes after the attack began, Vishwavihari Swami, at the Akshardham Temple Complex, made an SOS call to Chief Minister Narendra Modi's office and informed them about the attack. Within minutes, Gandhinagar's district police chief R.B.Brahmbhatt was dispatched to the scene. Additionally, the State Commando force was instructed to also arrive at the Akshardham Temple Complex. Meanwhile, outside of the Akshardham Temple Complex, local individuals mobilised into volunteers.

Shifting targets 

Thereafter, the terrorists, unable to infiltrate the main monument, moved towards the exhibition halls. The volunteers had locked all the doors of the exhibition halls; however, the terrorists entered Exhibition Hall 1, which contained the multimedia show, by prying open the exit door. Upon entering the hall, they fired shots at the audience, killing and wounding men, women and children.

By 5:15 pm, Chief Minister of Gujarat Narendra Modi called the Deputy Prime Minister L.K. Advani in Delhi and asked for the National Security Guards (NSG), commonly referred to as Black Cat Commandos. The terrorists left Exhibition Hall 1, as they entered, through the exit door, and climbed onto and hid in the parikrama, the outer perimeter of the temple.

Authorities pursue terrorists 
Within 10–15 minutes of the attack, police security guards and commandos had reached the premises. The police and commandos escorted the visitors from around the complex to safety, while volunteers helped transport the injured victims to nearby hospitals.  
 
The police and commandos searched for the two terrorists, who were focused on retreating to an alternative hiding spot. During this temporary halt, the police and commandos also guided the remaining 100 visitors in Exhibition Hall 1 to a safe location outside of the complex.

At 7:30 pm, as the security guards guided 30 visitors from inside the main monument to safety, the terrorists, who had climbed atop the parikrama, the outer perimeter of the temple, opened fire at the commandos. During this attack, no one was hurt. Since the commandos had surrounded the area and continued the crossfire, the terrorist found it difficult to escape.

National Security Guards (NSG) pursue and kill terrorists 
At 10:10 pm, two buses of NSG commandos and one bus filled with NSG equipment arrived at Akshardham. By approximately 11:30 pm, after reviewing multiple strategies, 35 Black Cat commandos positioned themselves throughout the Akshardham Temple Complex in an effort to find the terrorists.

The search for the terrorists continued throughout the night. At around midnight, the terrorists jumped down from the parikrama and entered a nearby bathroom. The National Security Guards planned to pass the night until daybreak before attempting to locate the terrorists.

During this time period, the guards fired in order to draw fire from the terrorists and consequently use up their ammunition. The officers situated themselves around the Akshardham Temple Complex. The National Security Guards were first in line, followed by men from the Rapid Action Force, Border Security Force, State Reserve Police and the Anti-Terrorist Squad.

As the night progressed, the terrorists moved into another area, a grove of trees near exhibition hall 3. By daybreak, the terrorists became desperate and the firing continued.

At approximately 6:45 am, the 14-hour-long ordeal ended with the Black Cat Commandos shooting the two terrorists hiding in the bushes. During this overnight search for the attackers, one state police officer and one commando lost their lives. Another commando, Surjan Singh Bhandari, was seriously injured and died in May 2004, after being in coma for two years.

Government reaction 

On 25 September 2002, then Prime Minister of India Atal Bihari Vajpayee said that the attack on the Akshardham Temple Complex in Gandhinagar, Gujarat was a well thought out conspiracy and that the central government will launch a thorough investigation and get to the bottom of it.

Aftermath 

The head of BAPS Swaminarayan Sanstha which manages the temple, Pramukh Swami Maharaj, appealed to maintain peace. The Gujarat government took the stance to maintain peace within the region and a resolve to promote solidarity. Peace was appealed by the Prime Minister of India Vajpayee, the Deputy PM L. K. Advani, Governor of Gujarat Sunder Singh Bhandari and Chief Minister of Gujarat Narendra Modi.

By the end of the attack, at least 30 persons were killed excluding attackers and more than 80 persons were wounded including at least 23 police officers. Apart from the 27 people killed in the first assault, two state police officers and one commando who lost their lives in the action. One more seriously injured commando Surjan Singh Bhandari was hit in the head with a bullet, he breathed his last after nearly 2 years of being in a coma.

BAPS also organized a condolence meeting after the attack. The prayer assembly commenced with devotional prayers sung by swamis for the peace of the departed souls, grieving relatives and all sympathisers. Then the entire gathering observed a 2-minute silent prayer for the deceased and injured, and for harmony. BAPS Swaminarayan Sanstha donated:

 Rs. 300,000 for the family of the deceased NSG Commando Subedar Suresh Chandra Yadav
 Rs. 200,000 each for the families of deceased State Commandos Shri Arjun Singh Gameti and Shri Allah Rakha Unadjam
 Rs. 200,000 for the injured NSG Commando Surjan Singh
 Rs. 100,000 for the 29 families of the pilgrims who died
 Rs. 25,000 each, to the injured soldiers
 Compensation for the injured pilgrims

The Akshardham attack and the response to it became a case study for the NSG. Brigadier Raj Seetapathy, the NSG commando in-charge of the rescue mission called 'Operation Thunderbolt' or 'Operation Vajra Shakti', asserted that the response to Akshardham terror attack had become a benchmark of clock-work achievement. The brigadier presented this case study, Akshardham Response: How to challenge an attack with calm and peace, at various centres, including the Sardar Patel Police Academy in Hyderabad and various Army training sessions. The Brigadier said "What Pramukh Swami Maharaj did was unbelievable. He pieced society back together. The Akshardham tragedy instilled a sense of confidence that Gujarat need not burn at every spark that is ignited. What I observed after the operation was the calm and serenity that was quickly restored. I have faced many violent encounters in my professional life but Akshardham response was a great learning both from operational and philosophical point of views.” The brigadier said that once the spiritual head decided to purify the souls of the two terrorists, the volunteers and devotees immediately fell silent. “There was no slogan shouting, no anger being expressed for any community. It was one of the most magnanimous and exemplary acts of restraint and responsibility that foiled the design of terrorists to spark more violence,” the brigadier said.

Reopening 
Fourteen days after the terrorist attack, the Akshardham complex in Gandhinagar was reopened to the public on 7 October 2002. As advised by government officials, increased security measures were taken to ensure the safety of the volunteers and visitors, including stationing the Central Reserve Police Force (CRPF) of Gujarat at the complex, requiring visitors have to pass through a metal detector, increasing the height of the boundary wall, and installing CCTV's around the campus.

Investigation

Summary

The intense investigation began soon after terrorists attacked Akshardham on 24 September 2002. A short summary of the Akshardham Attack Case Verdict is provided below:
 
In July 2006, the POTA court awarded death sentence to Adam Ajmeri, Shan Miya alias Chand Khan, who hails from Bareilly in Uttar Pradesh, and Mufti Abdul Qyyum Mansuri. While Mohammed Salim Shaikh from Ahmedabad, was sentenced to life imprisonment, Abdulmiyan Qadri got a 10-year term and Altaf Hussain five years. In 2008, some of the convicts went on appeal in the High Court. On 30 May 2010, the Gujarat High Court confirmed the death sentence awarded to three persons and prison terms to three.

Later in May 2014, a Supreme Court bench composed of Justices A K Patnaik and Venkate Gopala Gowda acquitted all six persons, including those awarded the death penalty. The Supreme Court slammed the Gujarat Police for the incompetence with which it investigated the case. "...we are convinced that accused persons are innocent with respect to the charges leveled against them," the court said.

First phase

Shortly after the 14-hour ordeal ended, the police began their investigation. According to Brigadier Raj Seetapathy, the gunmen carried letters in Urdu which affirmed their connection with an organisation called Tehrik-E-Kasas or Movement for Revenge, a previously unknown group to law enforcement officials. The letters suggested that the gunmen carried out the attack "because they could not tolerate what happened to children, women and Muslims during the Gujarat riots." The letters were translated for the National Security Guard (NSG) by Maulana Dawood Kausar Ashrafi of the Jama Masjid of Gandhinagar. Upon reading these letters, the officials believed that Tehrik-e-Kasas was formed specifically to avenge the Gujarat riots.

On 27 September 2002, Gujarat Police Chief K.Chakravarty interrogated the driver, Raju Thakur and car owner, Mansukh Acharya, who had provided the white Ambassador with plate number GJ-1-U-2234 for the attack. Raju Thakur explained that he transported the terrorists from Kalupur to Askhardham for Rs 120. Initial reports suggested that the terrorists arrived at the Kalupur railway station between 2:00 pm and 3:00 pm IST. During this interrogation, Raju Thakur and Mansukh Acharya informed the Gujarat police that they would be able to identify the militants from photos. The identity of the two terrorists was also established on 27 September 2002. The investigators claimed that the two terrorists, Mohammad Amjad (Lahore) and Hafiz Yaseen (Peshawar), were connected with terrorist groups Lashkar-i-Taiba and Jaish-i-Mohammad. A periodical published in Pakistan which included pictures of these two men in the columns dedicated to the dead was a major lead in establishing the identity of the terrorists.

Initially, the local crime branch was investigating the case, but after much deliberation the case was transferred to the Anti-Terrorist Squad. Consequently, approximately two weeks after the attack, the Forensic Science Laboratory received a set of articles collected from the temple premises and bodies. The FSL planned to analyse these materials to trace the origins of the conspiracy. In addition to the belongings of the terrorists, the FSL also received samples of grenade splinters and cartridges to ascertain their origin as well. While investigation agencies had suggested that the terrorists were foreigners, the evidence collected thus far suggested otherwise. The terrorists' undergarments, clothes and dry fruits were all purchased locally from the Kalupur area. During the initial months of the investigation, insufficient evidence resulted in conflicting reports and dead ends. Police officers and investigators claimed that they did not have sufficient information to establish basic information like "whether the killers came by train at all, and who their accomplices were." Over a month after the attack, the investigators claimed that they did not have any vital leads. Leena Mishra, a Times of India journalist noted that there is "only conflict about their identity and confusion about their number."

On 27 December 2002, the Anti-Terrorist Squad identified the two terrorists as Kashmiris, affiliated with Lashkar-e-Taiba and based in Jammu and ruled out the possibility of local contacts in the first breakthrough after claiming that this case reached a deadlock.  In the subsequent months, the investigation continued.

Second phase: Chand Khan’s revelation

On Friday, 29 August 2003, City Police Commissioner, K.R. Kaushik, told media persons that five people connected with the Akshardham case were arrested from various parts of the city. Furthermore, Kaushik stated that the conspiracy to attack Akshardham was planned in Riyadh and hatched by militant outfits, Jaish-I-Mohammad, Lashkar-I-Taiba and ISI Inter-Services Intelligence. In September 2003, reports suggesting that Hyderabadis were involved in the Akshardham attack conspiracy surfaced; however, the City Police Commissioner M V Krishna Rao dismissed these reports as mere speculation. Three days after the police claimed that there was no link between the Akshardham attack and Hyderabad, the Hyderabad police officials admitted that they were unaware of the investigations being carried out by the Gujarat counterparts. Even a year after the investigations began, conflicting reports continued. Even though the Gujarat police claimed they solved the case in August 2003 by arresting five individuals involved in the Akshardham Attack Conspiracy, a senior officer of the Jammu Kashmir police force, claimed that Chand Khan of Bareilly was one of the main individuals involved in the case.

The Jammu Kashmir police arrested Khan while he was on his way from Anantnag. This evidence contradicted the claims made by Ahmedabad police who had arrested five individuals, namely, Salim Hanif Shaikh, Altaf Akbar Hussain Malek, Aadaam Suleman Ajmeri, Mufti Abdulqayyum Mansuri and Maulana Abdullamiya Sayyed involved in the case. The Ahmedabad police claimed that the Akshardham attack was planned in Riyadh and discussed in Ahmedabad. However, the Jammu Kashmir police claimed that the attack was planned in Anantnag. Chand Khan spoke to the Times of India while in custody and explained that he and two Lashkar-e-Taiba militants from Pakistan, Shakeel and Abdullah left Anantnag on 19 September 2002 for Ahmedabad in an Ambassador car (license no KMT-413), on orders from Lakshar's Anantnag commander Abdullah Mansoor. First, Chand Khan and the two militants went to Bareilly, his home town, to drop off his wife and daughter. Thereafter, they took a train to Jaipur on 21 September 2002. During their travels, they carried their weapons in a bedding roll. From Jaipur, the three men boarded a bus for Ahmedabad on 22 September 2002. Upon arriving in Ahmedabad on 23 September, they checked in at the Gulshan Guest House. At 2pm on 24 September, they checked out of the guest house and hired a taxi from the railway station to take them to the Akshardham Temple Complex. Shakeel and Abdullah got into it carrying the haversack with arms and ammunition. The two fidayeen militants then carried out the attack while Chand Khan headed back to Kashmir. Upon returning to Kashmir, the Anantnag LeT chief Yasin awarded Chand Khan Rs 30,000 in reward. Even though Chand Khan allegedly confessed and revealed the origins of the conspiracy, the Gujarat police believed the Khan, who was in the custody of Jammu Kashmir police was not telling the whole truth.

D G Vanzara, DCP (crime), before leaving for J&K to interrogate Chand Khan, questioned the validity of his statements by stating, "Khan claims he reached Ahmedabad on 23 September 2002 and helped the two LeT terrorists accompanying him to attack the temple the very next day. This is next to impossible [without local support]." Once conspirators were in police custody, the Prevention of Terrorism Act (POTA) Judge Sonia Gokani extended the remand for Adam Suleman Ajmeri and Abdul Qayum Mansoori until 29 September. Harshendra Dhruv, Special Prosecutor, told the court that "the revelations made by the accused during the interrogation made it essential to seek further remand of the accused who now needed to be interrogated in the presence of Chand Khan." Dhruv submitted certain incriminating documents containing the details of expenses incurred in various activities that was found in Suleman's brother's house. Further investigation of Mansoori was required on the grounds that the handwriting experts confirmed that the two notes recovered from the terrorists were written by him. After gathering the aforementioned information, the Joint Commissioner of Police, PP Pandey informed reporters that "the temple attack was a joint operation conducted by several modules of Jaish I Mohammad, Lashkar-i-Taiba having their network from Riyadh in Saudi Arabia to Bareilly in Uttar Pradesh, Hyderabad, Ahmedabad and other cities."

On 7 September 2003, Jammu Kashmir Agricultural Minister Abdul Aziz Zargar denied reports which claimed that his Manzgam residence was a hideout from where the Akshardham temple attack was masterminded. Media reports quoted Chand Khan saying that two LeT militants had made Zargar's residence their hideout before leaving for the attack in Gujarat. However, Zargar said, "We are not involved in militancy at all. Instead we are under threat and many attacks have been carried out by militants on me and my family members in the past, records of which are filed with the police." The Jammu Kashmir minister Abdul Aziz Zargar resigned on 12 September 2003 amid allegations that terrorists who carried out the Akshardham temple attack Ahmedabad planned the operation at his native house. While Zargar denied any connection with LeT, Chand Khan, an accomplice in the Akshardham attack claimed they started their journey for Gujarat from Mr Zargar's residence.

On 30 September 2003, the POTA court extended the police custody of Chand Khan until 6 October 2003 so that the Detection of Crimes Bureau (DCB) could uncover additional facts about the conspiracy and gather information about the absconding conspirators. H M Dhruv stated that several questions remained unanswered because there were contradictions between Chand Khan's statements recorded by the Jammu Kashmir police and the DCB. According to Dhruv, "The investigating officers are yet to ascertain the identity of the person who brought the two terrorists from Bareilly to Ahmedabad while it is still unclear as to whose behest Chand Khan and two other persons came to Ahmedabad." On the other hand, Hashim Qureshi represented Chand Khan and stated if Khan who has been in police custody for over two months, first with the Jammu Kashmir police and now with the DCB, faces further interrogation he may lose his mental balance. Upon hearing both sides, POTA Judge announced that Khan would have six additional days of remand.

On 21 November 2003, POTA Judge Sonia Gokani upheld the application filed by the DCB seeking to keep the names of the 11 witnesses of the Akshardham Attack case a secret to protect them from those who are still absconding.

On 29 November 2003, Bharuch police began investigating the alleged involvement of four individuals from their district in the Akshardham attack. The charge sheet filed in the case with the POTA court included the names of Gulah Laheri, Majid Patel, Iqbal Patel and a 35-year-old unidentified individual. Even though the evidence suggested that these individuals resided in Bharuch and provided financial support for these terrorist activities; the Bharuch police explained that these individuals left Bharuch several years ago and do not live in the town any more. Amarsinh Vasava, Bharuch District Police Superintendent, explained that evidence suggests they resided in Bharuch but there is insufficient evidence to suggest that money was routed through Bharuch.

On 4 December 2003, the POTA court hearing the Akshardham Attack case issued warrants against 26 accused including Dawood Ibrahim and Chhota Shakeel. POTA Judge Gokani issued non-bailable arrest warrants against Dawood Ibrahim, Chhota Shakeel, Mufti Sufiyan Rasool Parti and others who had allegedly conspired and aided in transpiring the Akshardham Temple Attack.

Third phase: Trial

The Akshardham Attack Case trial began on Wednesday, 18 December 2003. H M Dhruv, Special Public Prosecutor, opened the case before POTA Judge Sonia Gokani and stated that “six persons including Kashmir based terrorist Chand Khan had allegedly conspired to attack the Akshardham Temple along with the slain terrorists.” All of the six accused individuals were present at the trial. Even though the trial began on 18 December 2003, the matter was adjourned until 26 December 2003. While the six men accused of assisting in the Akshardham attack were put on trial, 26 other individuals were still absconding.

In January 2004, Chand Khan's confessional statement mentioned that the motivating factors behind his involvement in the terrorist conspiracy were two-fold, a sum of Rs 30,000 and "the wish to avenge humiliation meted out to him by a corrupt police official in Jammu Kashmir." This confessional statement clarified some of the discrepancies present in Khan's initial remarks to Jammu Kashmir and DCB officials. Khan's involvement in the Akshardham attack was primarily motivated by his desire to kill a police inspector, Basir Ahmad, who consistently failed to pay the appropriate charges whenever he sent his car to Chand Garage in Bareilly. Frustrated by the situation, Khan approached a friend, Mohammad Yasin and asked for a bomb so that he could blow up the police officer's car. In June 2002, Yasin approached Khan and requested him to accompany him to Pokarnag to purchase some explosives. Khan borrowed a car from his garage and met with Abdulla Mansur aka Manzoor Chaudhary upon reaching Pokarnag. Manzoor agreed to provide the explosives to Khan as long as Khan helped Chaudhary with his plan. The Jammu Kashmir police claim that Chaudhary had planned the attack in Gujarat to avenge the deaths of Muslims during the communal riots. After this meeting, Chaudhary was killed in an encounter with Jammu Kashmir security forces. Thereafter, Khan did not make any reference to his plans for vengeance; police officers believe that his desire for money took precedence. Khan made trips to Majhgaon and became involved in the Akshardham Attack conspiracy allegedly involving LeT terrorists like Mohammad Zuber. Khan and Yasin bought an Ambassador car (KMT 423) worth Rs 35,000. Khan was compensated for his purchase and promised a sum of Rs 30,000 for smuggling the arms that the two terrorists used during the Akshardham Attack. Khan drove the Ambassador to Bareilly with his daughter, wife, Yasin and two LeT terrorists, Abdulla and Safiq, who were shot down by NSG commandos at Akshardham. There, Khan parted ways with the terrorists who reached Ahmedabad on their own. Khan and Mohammad Safir brought the arms to Ahmedabad which were hidden in two bed rolls via the Ala Hazrat Express.

On 21 February 2004, Yasin Butt was arrested by the Jammu Kashmir police upon receiving intelligence from Chand Khan. Gujarat Police claim that Butt travelled separately to Ahmedabad with the two militants who carried out the attack and received the assistance of five associates, who had also been arrested by the police.

In 2004, the Ahmedabad city police, upon seeking Scotland Yard's help with regards to the Akshardham Attack Case, named Abu Hamza the mastermind behind the Akshardham Attack. On Thursday, 27 May 2004, Hamza was arrested before dawn by the Scotland Yard in London. D G Vanzara said, "Formal and informal inquiries have been initiated in connection with Hamza's arrest and his links to the Akshardham case." We are closely following the developments relating to Hamza." According to the DCB's charge sheet, Hamza planned the Akshardham attack in Saudi Arabia to avenge the communal riots. His co-conspirators included Abu Sifiyan of Riyadh and Abut Talah of Jeddah. They took the help of Salim Shaikh, who worked in Riyadh but was from Dariapur, Ahmedabad. Salim was among the first to be arrested while the others were still hiding out.

In April 2006, the Gujarat Police submitted a progress report to the POTA court which suggested that they police may have again reached a deadlock in the Akshardham Attack Case. Their submission stated that 26 individuals are still hiding. The DCB did not have any pictures of these individuals who were hiding abroad. Among the accused individuals that left India for Saudi Arabia were Mohammad Hanif Shaikh, Abdul Rashid Suleman Ajmeri and Mohammed Kadri. Sudhir Brahmbhatt explained that the accused could not be brought to India because there was no extradition treaty between Pakistan, Saudi Arabia and India. Furthermore, the DCB also claimed that Majid Patel, Iqbal Patel and Gulam Laheri have sought refuge in Saudi Arabia.

On 2 July 2006, Adam Suleman Ajmeri, Abdul Qayyum alias Mufti Saheb Mohammed Mansuri and Chand Khan alias Shan Miya were awarded the death sentence. Mohammed Salim Hanif Shaikh was sentenced to life imprisonment. And Altaf Hussain Akbar Hussain Malek and Abdullahmiya Yasinmiya Kadri were sentenced to five and ten years of imprisonment respectively. It was ruled that all the six accused had to pay a fine ranging between Rs 85,000 and Rs 100,000 under the sections of POTA and Indian Penal Code. When the POTA court announced the Akshardham Attack Case verdict, the investigators thanked JJ Patel, the handwriting expert who helped them solve the case. JJ Patel assisted in finding Abdul Qayyum Mohammed Mansuri alias Mufti Saheb by studying the letters found on the two slain terrorists. According to Patel, these letters were written in Urdu and had an Arabic touch, while the letters and style clearly pointed towards Mansuri. Patel's verdict was later upheld by the forensic science laboratory in Delhi. After the officials concluded that Mansuri had written those letters, the officials questioned Mansuri. The interrogation unveiled the entire terrorist plot and revealed the other individuals involved in planning and executing the attack.

Fourth phase: Appeals

On Wednesday, 26 March 2008, the Gujarat High Court began hearing the appeal by six persons convicted in the Akshardham Attack Case. Majid Memon, senior criminal lawyer, represented the convicts and raised questions regarding the letters recovered from the bodies of the terrorists. Memon contended, "The investigating agency's approach towards the two chits was very casual even though it claimed that these letters were the only evidence available in the initial stage." Furthermore, Memon claimed that the handwriting experts did not know Urdu at all and that the prosecution failed to mention when these letters were recovered before the POTA court.

On 19 October 2008, Majid Patel was arrested by the Bharuch Local Police, after which the Ahmedabad DCB took him into custody.

On 19 July 2009, a suspected LeT operative allegedly involved in the Akshardham attack was arrested by counter-intelligence cell in Hyderabad. Shaukatullah Ghauri arrived to Hyderabad from Saudi Arabia and was arrested at the RGI Airport in Shamsabad on Saturday 18 July 2009. Ghauri and Farhatullah, his brother, were wanted by the Gujarat Police and an arrest warrant was pending against the two under POTA after the Akshardham Attack.

On Monday, 20 July 2009, the POTA court sent Ghauri to 15 days police remand against a demand of a 30-day remand. Ghauri was the eighth person caught out of a total 26 accused in the Akshardham Attack. He was accused of hatching the conspiracy, providing financial and logistical support and arms and ammunition to the two terrorists who stormed the temple. In the remand application, the DCB stated that it was necessary to know which terrorist outfits Ghauri was in touch with and the other individual involved in the attack.

In November 2009, Adam Ajmeri, Shan Miya alias Chand Khan, Mufti Abdul Qayyum Mansuri, approached the court and urged judges to pronounce a verdict on their appeal against POTA court's order of 2006. A petition was filed by Ajmeri, Qadri, Shaikh and Mansuri contending that the court started hearing their appeal with the state government's appeal for confirmation of capital punishment on 14 March 2008. Petitioner's lawyer Ejaz Qureshi cited a Supreme Court judgment that insists on finalising the case wherein capital punishment is awarded within six months. The Supreme Court order also says that in case the high court bench cannot pronounce its order in detail, it should at least pronounce the operative part of it.

On 29 January 2010, the Gujarat High Court adjourned the hearing of an appeal filed by the accused of the Akshardham case to 1 March 2010. A bench of the High Court had already heard the appeal against the order of the designated POTA court sentencing the accused and reserved the judgment. However, the judgment was not delivered after a year and half. As a result, the convicts motioned a plea.

On Friday 19 March 2010, Shaukat Hussain Ghauri contended the Ashfak Bhavnagari and Jalal Patel (who appeared as prosecution witnesses) were also supporting terrorist activities, were present during the meetings in Saudi Arabia and had collected monies for the Akshardham attack. However, the Gujarat High Court rejected Ghauri's plea because the advocate for the State highlighted that under Section 50 of the POTA, which was applicable in the Akshardham case, the designated judge had no jurisdiction to take cognizance of the alleged involvement of witnesses in the attack. Furthermore, no inference about their involvement in terrorist activity could be made.

On Tuesday, 1 June 2010, the Gujarat High Court upheld the POTA court's verdict, awarding death sentences to three accused in the Akshardham Attack Case. Justice R M Doshit and K M Thakar confirmed the death sentence of three convicts and various prison terms of the three others, while expressing that they did not deserve leniency. The Akshardham Terror Attack Case was the first judgment of the designated court under the now repealed POTA which was affirmed by the Gujarat High Court.

On 7 September 2010 Ajmeri and Qayyum, who were convicted by a POTA court in Gujarat and awarded death sentence in connection with the Akshardham temple attack case, told the Supreme Court that the investigation was faulty. Nevertheless, the Gujarat High Court had affirmed the Special POTA Court verdict. On their plea that challenged the High Court verdict, "the Supreme Court stayed the death sentence and issued notice to Gujarat."

In October 2010, David Coleman Headley, a Pakistani-American Lashkar Operative informed US and Indian investigators that Muzzamil, aide of LeT's Chief Military commander Zaki-ur-Rehman Lahvi, was involved in planning and executing the Akshardham Attack.

On 25 December 2012, the bench of Justice AK Patnaik and Justice HL Gokhale directed the trial court to speed up the proceedings while refusing to bail one of the two accused persons, Shakuatullah Ghauri from Hyderabad. Ghauri and Majid Patel were arrested after the POTA court completed the trial against six persons in the case. The accused have filed appeals against their conviction in the apex court after the Gujarat High Court upheld the POTA court's verdict. Ghauri and Majid were charged with hatching the conspiracy and providing financial assistance in carrying out the terrorist activities.

Supreme Court decision

On 16 May 2014, a Supreme Court bench composed of Justices A K Patnaik and Venkate Gopala Gowda acquitted all six persons, including those awarded the death penalty. The Supreme Court slammed the Gujarat Police for the incompetence with which it investigated the case. The bench gave the decision holding that the prosecution failed to establish the guilt of the accused. The Bench said in their judgment : "We intend to express our anguish about the incompetence with which the investigating agencies conducted the investigation of the case of such a grievous nature, involving the integrity and security of the nation. Instead of booking the real culprits responsible for taking so many precious lives, police caught innocent people and got imposed the grievous charges against them which resulted in their conviction and subsequent sentencing... On the basis of the issues, we have already answered the facts and evidence on record and on the basis of the legal principles laid down by this court, we are convinced that accused persons are innocent with respect to the charges leveled against them," the court said.

In popular culture 
The 2021 direct-to-video film State of Siege: Temple Attack, directed by Ken Ghosh, is a fictional retelling of the attack.

See also
List of hostage crises
Akshardham (Gandhinagar)
Allegations of state terrorism committed by Pakistan

References

External links
Temple website

21st-century mass murder in India
Attacks in India in 2002
Mass murder in 2002
History of Gujarat (1947–present)
Islamic terrorism in India
Swaminarayan Sampradaya
Terrorist incidents in India in 2002
Attacks on religious buildings and structures in India
Massacres in India
Massacres in religious buildings and structures
Hostage taking in India
Violence against Hindus in India
Mass shootings in India
History of Ahmedabad
Crime in Gujarat
21st-century Hinduism
Islamic terrorist incidents in 2002
2002 mass shootings in Asia
2002 murders in India
September 2002 events in India
Events in Ahmedabad